Harold Edson Shear (December 6, 1918 – February 1, 1999) was an admiral in the United States Navy.

Born in New York City, Shear graduated from the United States Naval Academy soon after December 7, 1941.

Shear served as the first Blue Crew commanding officer of the ballistic missile submarine USS Patrick Henry (SSBN-599).

As a full admiral, Shear held the commands of Commander in Chief, United States Naval Forces Europe from 1974 to1975, Vice Chief of Naval Operations from 1975 to 1977, Commander in Chief, Allied Forces Southern Europe from July 18, 1977 to 1980. Retiring at the age of 62 in May 1980, he later became the administrator of the United States Maritime Administration.

Shear died after a long illness in 1999.

References

1918 births
1999 deaths
Vice Chiefs of Naval Operations
United States Navy admirals
Military personnel from New York City
Recipients of the Navy Distinguished Service Medal
United States Naval Academy alumni
Recipients of the Silver Star
Recipients of the Defense Distinguished Service Medal
United States Navy personnel of World War II
United States Department of Transportation officials
Reagan administration personnel
Burials at Arlington National Cemetery